Time of death is the presumed moment a death has occurred.

Time of Death may also refer to:
 Time of Death, a 2013 American documentary television series.
 "Time of Death", a 2014 episode in season 2 of the TV series Arrow
 "Time of Death", a 2018 episode of the TV series The Rookie
 Time of Death, a 2013 Canadian TV film starring Kathleen Robertson